Jacques Marie Prevel (July 27, 1915 in Bolbec – May 27, 1951 in Sainte-Feyre) was a French poet. His real first name was Jacques, but he added 'Marie' not to be mistaken with Jacques Prévert, whose surname is pronounced in a very similar way. During the German occupation he lived in the famous Parisiene district Saint-Germain-des-Près.

Among his friends were the members of the Le Grand Jeu movement, René Daumal and Roger Gilbert-Lecomte, and also Antonin Artaud. Prevel considered Artaud his master, but Artaud admired Prevel's writings as well - he wrote about him (often "more portraying himself" ) and dictated his visions to him. Prevel also supplied Artaud with laudanum and opium. Prevel died of tuberculosis in the Sainte-Peyre hospital in the arms of his second love Jany.

Bibliography

Poetry
"It will be essential to work until the end of times, to find again the Gesture and the Word.".

Poèmes mortels (1945); Mortal poems
Poèmes pour toute mémoire (1947); Poems for all the memory
De colère et de haine (1950); From rage and hatred
En dérive vers l’absolu (1952); On the crossroad to the absolute, posthumously

Diary
En compagnie d'Antonin Artaud (1974); In the company of Antonin Artaud, posthumously

References

External links
Short info and photo, in French

1915 births
1951 deaths
20th-century French male writers
20th-century French poets
French male poets
Poètes maudits
20th-century deaths from tuberculosis
Tuberculosis deaths in France